The Weekly Mail was an English-language newspaper distributed in Wales, the Forest of Dean, and areas of Gloucestershire and Somerset. It contained general news and literary works including short sketches of aspects of Welsh life. Associated titles: Cardiff Weekly Mail and South Wales Advertiser (1878–1880); Weekly Mail and Cardiff Times (1928–1955).

References

Newspapers published in Wales